The 2006 Stratford-on-Avon District Council election took place on 4 May 2006 to elect members of Stratford-on-Avon District Council in Warwickshire, England. One third of the council was up for election and the Conservative Party stayed in overall control of the council.

After the election, the composition of the council was
Conservative 30
Liberal Democrat 20
Independent 3

Campaigns
19 seats were due to be contested in the election but in Wellesbourne, independent Roger Wright did not face any opposition meaning that only 18 seats saw contests take place. Both the Conservatives, who were defending 11 seats, and the Liberal Democrats, who were defending 7, were hoping to make gains in the election, while the Labour party only put up 4 candidates in the election.

The Conservatives campaigned on pledges to take action over traffic congestion and to keep council tax levels low. However the Liberal Democrats said that big improvements in services were needed and that improving basic services should be put before any ambitious plans for the area.

Election result
The results saw no seats change hands with the Conservatives remaining in control of the council as a result. Overall turnout in the election was 41.5%.

Ward results

References

2006 English local elections
2006
2000s in Warwickshire